The 18th Guards Insterburg Red Banner Order of Suvorov Motor Rifle Division, is an active division of the Russian Ground Forces.

History 
The 18th Guards Motor Rifle Division was formed originally as the 133rd Rifle Division at Novosibirsk in 1939. The division was part of 1st Shock Army on 1 December 1941 during the Battle of Moscow. It was redesignated as the 18th Guards Rifle Division in March 1942 with the 51st, 53rd, 58th Guards Rifle Regiments and 52nd Guards Artillery Regiment. The division fought in the East Prussian Offensive. The unit became 30th Guards Mechanised Division in 1945 as part of the 11th Guards Army. In 1965 it was renumbered as 18th Guards Motor Rifle Division. It was stationed in the Kaliningrad enclave with 11th Guards Army before entering Czechoslovakia in 1968, joining the Central Group of Forces.

In 1991 the division was withdrawn back to Gusev, Kaliningrad Oblast. The division was reorganised as a cadre strength formation, as part of the third-line reserves of the Russian Ground Forces. In 2002, it became the 79th Separate Guards Motor Rifle Brigade. The division was reformed from the 79th Separate Guards Motor Rifle Brigade in Kaliningrad in December 2020 as part of the 11th Army Corps. In 2022, elements of the division were reportedly heavily engaged in combat in from the start of the invasion of Ukraine.

Structure (1990s)
210th Motor Rifle Regiment;
275th Guards Motor Rifle Regiment;
278th Guards Motor Rifle Regiment;
280th Guards Motor Rifle Regiment;
52nd Guards Artillery Regiment

Honorifics are Insterburgskaya Krasnoznamennaya and Order of Suvorov.

Structure (2020/21)
 275th Motorized Rifle Regiment
 280th Motorized Rifle Regiment
 79th Guards Motorized Rifle Regiment (former 79th Independent Guards Motorized Rifle Brigade reformed as a regiment)
 11th Independent Tank Regiment (Gusev, Kaliningrad Oblast) (Military Unit Number V/Ch (в/ч) 41611) (Equipped with T-72B Main Battle Tanks (upgrades of T-72s to B3M-standard underway as of 2019/20)
 20th Separate Reconnaissance Battalion (forming 2020/21; Orlan-10 UAVs and "Sobolyatnik" and "Fara-VR" reconnaissance radars)
 22nd Guards Anti-Aircraft Missile Regiment (Tor M1/M2), in Kaliningrad

References

Further reading
 Советская Военная Энциклопедия: [В 8 томах] / Пред. Гл. ред. комиссии Н. В. Огарков – М.: Воениздат, 1977. Т. 4. 1977, 656 с., ил. "Инстербургско-Кёнигсбергская операция" стр. 471—472.
 

 В. И. Феськов К. А. Калашников В. И. Голиков "Красная Армия в победах и поражениях 1941-45 гг" Часть I.
 "Боевой состав Советской Армии. Часть III. (январь — декабрь 1943 г)., Москва, Военное изд. Мин. Обороны, 1972 г.,

External links
http://wikimapia.org/7820871/79th-Separate-Guards-Motor-Rifle-Brigade

018
018
Military units and formations established in 1965
Military units and formations disestablished in 2001
1939 establishments in the Soviet Union